Pampuchy (see alternative names) are a type of steamed yeast dumpling (kluski) or doughnut (pączek) in Polish cuisine. A cooked pampuch (sing.) has an oval, flat on the bottom shape, with a bouncy, mushy and soft consistency.

Prepared, uncooked pampuchy can be generally bought in most grocery shops in Poland.

Etymology

Regional variations

Kuyavia
The Kuyavian variation, named /, is a protected product under geographical indications and traditional specialities in the European Union.

Traditionally, the dish was served on the daily Kuyavian-Pomeranian home dinner table as a main meal or snack. Generally it is served with sauce, as a savoury dish, or sweet with sour cream and sugar or with fruit.

Lublin Land
The following pampuchy variations are found on the Polish Ministry of Agriculture and Rural Development's List of Traditional Products:
 ( with millet kasza)—originated from the surroundings of the village of Kąkolewnica in Lublin Voivodeship. A pyzy-type dish with a light millet kasza filling.
 (Brzozowice  with cabbage and mushrooms)—originated from the village of Brzozowica Mała, Gmina Kąkolewnica. A -type dish with a light wild mushroom and cabbage filling.
 ( with cheese)—originated from the village of Kąkolewnica, Lublin Voivodeship. A pyzy-type dish with a light white cheese filling. 
 (Żakowala  with lentils)—originated from the village of Żakowola Poprzeczna. A light savoury  dish with a ground lentil filling, with added fried onion.

Greater Poland

Margarine is added to the kneaded dough. The cooking pot is then lined with a small cloth, onto which small oval-shaped dough balls are placed, then covered and cooked for approximately 20 minutes. Traditionally, cooked pampuchy are served with red cabbage and baked duck with apples. The aforesaid dish is a traditional, festive dish in Poznań cuisine.

Traditionally these are served with pork chops and sweet-sour fried white cabbage, or stuffed with fruit and melted butter, sugar and cinnamon.

Upper Silesia

In Upper Silesia (as in buchty cake) pampuchy are traditionally served with berry kompot (blackberries), powidła, pork, sauerkraut, or topped with melted butter and sprinkled with sugar.

The Opole Silesia variation, named ,  ('Silesian ', or 'steamed yeast dumplings'), since March 6, 2007 is found on the Polish Ministry of Agriculture and Rural Development's List of Traditional Products.

See also
Pyzy
Knedle

References

Dumplings
Polish cuisine
Pomeranian cuisine
Silesian cuisine